Liu Liangmo     Liángmó)  (6 November 1909 – 8 August 1988) was a musician and Chinese Christian leader known for his promotion of the patriotic mass singing movement in the 1930s and promotion in the United States of support for China's resistance to Japan in World War II. He was a leader in the Three-Self Patriotic Movement (TSPM) after 1949.

Education and discovery of mass singing 
While in middle school Liu converted to Christianity and soon became a student secretary (organizer) for the Shanghai YMCA. He attended University of Shanghai, a Baptist missionary institution, where he did not receive formal musical training but sang in the university church choir. He graduated in 1932 with a degree in sociology. He then took a position with the Chinese National YMCA.

China did not have a tradition of group singing, but Christian church congregations and mission student groups had begun to use music as an attraction as early as the 19th century. When Liu happened upon Music United People, a book of songs, he was moved to form singing groups as a way of promoting patriotism and moral virtue. Liu declared  “My plan was to make music the possession of all and not the privilege of the few.” In February 1935, with encouragement from the YMCA, Liu established a mass singing club for some sixty clerks, doorkeepers, office boys, elevator operators, and apprentices. Within a week, the number of participants had nearly tripled, and by mid-1936 the group, known as the People’s Song Association, had attracted more than 1,000 members, with regional branches in Hong Kong and Guangzhou.

Mass singing and resistance to Japan
Liu wrote in 1935
If we Chinese want to break free of imperialism’s iron shackles..., if we want China to exert itself, our people must be able to loudly and vigorously sing powerful songs full of spirit and vitality. If the people of China can sing these songs, no doubt the sound will shake the earth. Any youth who can sing should spread the “people’s song” movement to each province, city, county, and countryside. The dawning of a new China will arrive when all the people of China can sing these majestic and powerful songs.
In June 1936 Liu stood on a two-meter high platform in a sports arena in Shanghai packed with thousands to lead a several hundred member chorus in "The March of the Volunteers, " a patriotic song which after 1949 became the national anthem. Mass singing became even more widespread as it proved its ability to mobilize patriotic support for the government following the Xi'an Incident of December 1936.

As relations with Japan grew more tense, in February 1937, at the invitation of General Fu Zuoyi and acting under the auspices of the national YMCA, Liu formed a war zone Soldier Relief Board in Suiyuan, in western China. Liu later recalled that General Fu told him that “Mass singing and slogans are the two great weapons to train the people and soldiers. Of the two, singing is more important because during the war it can stimulate a spirit of unity among our soldiers and masses.”

Israel Epstein, then a young reporter for a Tianjin newspaper, reported many years later that he first heard Liu in the gymnasium of the Tianjin YMCA in the summer of 1937. The hall was filled with “ordinary people from the street – students, petty clerks, workmen, schoolchildren, newsboys, and even rickshaw pullers,” who “with serious faces repeated the separate phrase of the song they were being taught. Then they sang two phrases at a time. Then a whole stanza....” Epstein further recalled that Liu
seemed to be listening to and prompting each singer separately, while at the same time he never stopped singing. He seemed two men – one singing, like his audience with relieved passion at being able at last to utter the ‘one last cry’ of every Chinese; the other disciplined and methodical, teaching and listening.
Two Japanese detectives appeared, and some of the audience seemed intimidated, but Liu merely said that the doors of the hall were open to all who had come to sing, and asked the detectives to join in singing "March of the Volunteers." Afterwards Liu explained to Epstein that if he had allowed the Japanese to intimidate him, the young men he hoped to train would have drifted away, but that if he had incited the crowd to throw the Japanese out, the movement would have been shut down. "You do not realize," he told Epstein, how important an instrument an easily learned song is." Many Chinese cannot read, but "the song carries resistance from mouth to mouth."

After the outbreak of the war with Japan in August 1937, Liu continued to work with the YMCA Soldier Relief Board to provide shelter and relief for wounded soldiers. For a while the United Front provided a truce between the Communist and Nationalist Parties, but by the summer of 1939, the United Front was breaking down. While the Communists were enthusiastic about music as a way to mobilize popular support, the Nationalists were suspicious that popular cultural activities were being manipulated to Communist advantage. The Soldier Relief Board and Liu's team of relief workers were in Changsha, Hunan, when the local Nationalist military burned the town to prevent it from falling into the hands of an anticipated Japanese advance which never materialized. Liu’s group managed to save the YMCA building and to evacuate many of the wounded soldiers, but determined it would be safer to move on to Zhejiang.

In Zhejiang, Liu tried to keep good relations with local Nationalist government and army, but when Zhou Enlai visited him, the military police became suspicious and raided Liu's relief camp. The communist New Fourth Army invited him to join their cultural work, but Liu feared the political control that the move would have required. Liu saw his Christian faith as more important than loyalty to either the GMD or the CCP. Liu set out for Shanghai to seek the support of Soong Ching-ling, the widow of Sun Yat-sen, who had become the protector of leftist cultural activities, but before he could reach her the Nationalist police put him under house arrest. Only the intervention of the American YMCA freed him. He soon left with his family for the United States and did not return to China for nearly ten years.

In the United States, 1940-1949
Mass singing continued to be Liu's weapon to raise support for China. He briefly attended Crozer Theological Seminary a Baptist institution outside Philadelphia.  When he arrived in New York in 1940 he immediately organized a chorus for the Chinese Youth Club that sang for war rallies.

Liu also rallied support for China's war effort through the international network of progressive figures. Soon after he arrived in New York, Liu mentioned to a friend that he knew of the African American singer and political activist Paul Robeson and his early support for China,  and said that he would like to meet him. The friend (perhaps Lin Yutang) phoned Robeson, who came within half an hour. At a concert at New York's Lewisohn Stadium a few weeks later, Robeson sang Cheelai  in what Liu described as "perfect Mandarin." Reportedly in communication with the original lyricist Tian Han, the pair translated the anthem into English. In early 1941 Liu and the Children's Chorus recorded an album of Chinese songs with Robeson for Keynote Records.

Liu toured the country  to raise money for United China Relief. and appeared onstage with such figures as Pearl S. Buck and Eleanor Roosevelt in a series of rallies which attracted thousands in New York and Philadelphia . He also appeared in places with a less high profile, such as Bedford, Trimble County, in the hills of Kentucky, where some 400 farmers contributed eggs, sorghum, chickens, turkeys, potatoes, apples, corn and home canned foods to be auctioned. Liu told reporters "These are the American people, and they are doing their best to help their own boys and the suffering people of the United Nations through the National War Fund." "

As he became more familiar with American society, Liu grew openly critical of its racism towards African-Americans and Asians. Liu linked the interests of the two non-white groups. He declared to students at Lincoln University in Philadelphia that "If we lick fascism and Japanese imperialism we lick jim crow and anti-Semitism at the same time." The editor of the Pittsburgh Courier, a newspaper with a primarily black readership, then asked Liu to become a regular contributor to the editorial page.  Liu urged readers to start a write-in campaign to tell Congress to repeal the Chinese Exclusion Act and pass the Anti-poll Tax Bill and the Anti Lynching Bill.

Yet Liu was disappointed that some blacks were suspicious of Chinese. He explained to the Chinese Hand Laundry Alliance, another key progressive ally, that blacks were "treated poorly and often heard insulting words in Chinese restaurants." and their disappointment turned to anger. "We should understand that blacks and we Chinese are like each other," he continued, "we are the nations being discriminated against and oppressed....."    When accusations of racism were made against a Chinese restaurant owner on the West Coast Liu urged his readers to report any such incidents to the Chinese consul. He pointed to the African American and Chinese soldiers who worked side by side building the Burma Road in China, declaring that these men "know that all are comrades and brothers." During Madme Chiang Kai-shek's visit to the United States in 1943, Liu was openly critical of the Nationalist government of her husband, even more so when she made remarks that seemed to disparage African Americans. By 1945 these incidents had made the Pittsburgh Courier'''s African American readers so distrustful of Chinese that the publisher discontinued Liu's connection with the paper.

In 1945 Liu addressed the Chinese Students' Christian Association, the oldest such group in North America, to attack the dictatorial rule of the Nationalists. In 1949, when he was about to be deported, Liu returned to China.

The New China
In September 1949 Liu attended the People's Consultative Conference in Beijing, along with other left-liberal figures. Liu was among those suggesting that March of the Volunteers be made the new National Anthem.  In July 1950, Liu, along with YMCA secretary Y.T. Wu and other Christian leaders, signed an open letter calling on Christians to support the New China, and joined with other Protestants in organizing the Three Self Patriotic Movement, which called for the Chinese church to be independent of foreign control and finance. Liu published articles in the Three Self Patriotic Movement's journal, Tian Feng, such as one criticizing imperialism (May 19, 1951). The Shanghai YMCA Press published books by Liu explaining Mao Zedong's New Democracy and How America Uses Religion to Invade China''.

In July 1951, the Three -Self Patriotic Movement sent Liu and a work team to the Shanghai headquarters of the Seventh-day Adventists, where they held three public accusation meetings. Liu prepared his work group by explaining that a successful meeting would use charges of "imperialism, bandits, and wicked tyrants" to "arouse the righteous indignation and accusations of Christians towards imperialism and bad elements in the churches.” Liu explained the stages in which emotions would be handled: “first high tension, then moderate, then another of high tension... only so can the accusation meeting be a success.” Before each meeting, Liu rehearsed the participants, reviewed the accusation speeches, and ordered the accusers to memorize them and to shed tears when talking about their sufferings. Participants were to shout anti- imperialist slogans and sing revolutionary songs.

In 1954 Liu attended the First National Chinese Christian Conference, held in Beijing,

Following the end of the Cultural Revolution, during which Christians and their churches were attacked, Liu held positions in the Chinese YMCA and the Shanghai government.  In 1978 a forum to solicit views on amending the Constitution was held in Shanghai. Y.T.  Wu, Liu’s longtime colleague, was then in the hospital, but asked Liu to read the meeting his statement requesting that the article on freedom of religious belief be returned to the wording of the 1954 Constitution. The article was not changed at that time.

In 1982, Liu, then vice-chairman of the Shanghai Political Consultative Conference, submitted a photo to Liberation Daily which he had taken in 1938 when he visited Nanjing to record the atrocities wrought by the Japanese army. The photo was of a hospitalized little girl who had lost her arm. The girl, by then a school teacher, saw it and came to see Liu in Shanghai.

Liu died in Shanghai in 1988.

Selected publications
 
 
 
, translated and reprinted in Judy Yung, Gordon Chang, and Him Mark Lai, eds.,  Chinese American Voices: From the Gold Rush to the Present (Berkeley: University of California Press, 2006), pp. 204– 208.

Notes

References

 

  (unpaged online version)
 
 

1909 births
1988 deaths
Three-Self Patriotic Movement
Chinese Protestants
University of Shanghai alumni
Musicians from Ningbo
YMCA leaders